Puthuvely is a small village in Kottayam district of Kerala state, South India. It is a border village of Kottayam district.

Economy
The village's economy depends mainly on crop plantations like rubber, cocoa, pepper, ginger and foreign income from workers abroad. People from different communities live very peacefully here. Hindus,  Knanaya Catholics of http://www.syromalabarchurch.in/parish.php?id=4174 and Orthodox and Jacobites are the main communities. Most of village consists of a single large family and its several branches. 
Major source of the village's income is from agriculture.

Location
Puthuvely is situated on the MC road, 4 km south of Koothattukulam and 3 km north of Monippally. There are roads to Areekara, Veliyannoor, Uzhavoor, Elangi from here.

Schools
It has a Government Higher Secondary School named [GOVT HSS PUTHUVELY ] and a Primary School and a college named Mar Kuriakose Arts and Science College (Affiliated to Mahatma Gandhi University Kottayam ) run by Divine Educational & Charitable Trust Puthuvely

Village products
It is also famous for its toddy shop named Puthuvely Kallu Shapu. It is also famous for its toddy from Coconut.

References

Villages in Kottayam district